Cinnamol can refer to:
A brand of cinnamon oil (cinnamon bark oil or oil of cinnamon)
A brand of paracetamol in Nigeria
An uncommon name of styrene (styrol, vinylbenzene, phenylethene, ethenylbenzene, cinnamène), so named when it was produced by decarboxylating cinnamic acid in the 1800s

See also
 Cinnamyl alcohol